Dhinamdhorum is a 1998 Indian Tamil-language romantic drama film directed by Nagaraj. The film stars Murali and Suvalakshmi. The film, which has music by Oviyan, released in February 1998. The film was remade in Telugu as Manasichi Choodu.

Cast
Murali as Aadhi
Suvalakshmi as Booma
Manivannan as M.L.A Kesavamoorthy
Renuka as Chandra
Kitty as Aadhi's father
Malaysia Vasudevan as Booma's father
Vadivukkarasi as Aadhi's mother
Sathyapriya as Booma's mother
Deepa Venkat as Aadhi's sister
Nagaraj as Aadhi's friend
Bala Singh as Government officer
Mahanadi Shankar as Subbaiya
Halwa Vasu as Village man
Thalaivasal Vijay as Guest appearance

Soundtrack 
Soundtrack was composed by Oviyan.
"Devadhai" - Mano, Chorus 
"En Vanam Needhana" - S. P. Balasubrahmanyam, Shenoy Balesh 
"Nenjathil" - P. Unnikrishnan, Anuradha Sriram
"O Kannukkul" - Unnikrishnan, Swarnalatha
"Pattadhari" - Shiva, Febi Mani 
"Pesathae" - Oviyan 
"Pookkal Malaruthu" - Gopal Sharma, Febi Mani

Release
The film won positive reviews upon release, with a critic from Indolink.com noting it was a "good start for Nagaraj" and that the film was "recommended." A critic from Dinakaran noted "this is one of the very rare and good films among recent releases in Tamil".

The success of the film prompted the director to add Dhinamdhorum as a prefix to his industry name. Despite the strong performance of the film, Nagaraj found it difficult to establish his career as a director and several of his later films including Vinnai Thoduvom, with the same cast, during 1998 were cancelled.

References

1998 films
1990s Tamil-language films
1998 romantic drama films
Indian romantic drama films
Unemployment in fiction
1998 directorial debut films
Tamil films remade in other languages